Jia Xiaochen (born September 20, 1982), also known as JJ Jia and Fatumai, is a Chinese actress and model of Hui ethnicity based in Hong Kong.

Personal life
In 2012, JJ began dating martial arts action star Louis Fan. The two married on 1 January 2016 in Hong Kong. In November 2017, they had a daughter nicknamed Little Rice Bowl (小飯兜).

Filmography

Film

Television dramas

References

External links

Weibo
StarJ & SNAZZ's official profile
Official blog

1982 births
Living people
Actresses from Jinan
Chinese female models
Hong Kong film actresses
Hong Kong female models
Hong Kong television actresses
Hong Kong Muslims
Hong Kong people of Hui descent
Hui actresses
People with acquired residency of Hong Kong
Chinese expatriates in Hong Kong
21st-century Chinese actresses
Chinese film actresses
Chinese television actresses
21st-century Hong Kong actresses
University of Jinan alumni